The banded topminnow (Fundulus cingulatus) is a North American species of temperate freshwater killifish belonging to the genus Fundulus of the family Fundulidae.

Taxonomy 
The species name cingulatus, also derived from Latin means "girded". The banded topminow was first described by American zoologist Achille Valenciennes in 1846, when it was sighted near Charleston, South Carolina. 

The common name, "banded topminnow", refers to the distinct olive-green bandings found along their sides.

References 

Taxa named by Achille Valenciennes
Fish described in 1846
Fundulus